Meng Zhaozhen (13 September 1932 – 15 July 2022) was a Chinese landscape architect who was a professor at Beijing Forestry University, and an academician of the Chinese Academy of Engineering.

Biography
Meng was born in Wuhan, Hubei, on 13 September 1932. After graduating from Nankai High School in 1952, he was admitted to Beijing Agricultural University (now China Agricultural University), where he majored in landscape architecture. He joined the Chinese Communist Party (CCP) in February 1956. After graduation, he stayed and taught at the university. After university department adjustment, he moved to Beijing Forestry University, where he successively served as an assistant, lecturer, associate professor, and professor.

On 15 July 2022, he died from an illness in Beijing, at the age of 89.

Contributions
His works include Fairy Lake Botanical Garden, Sugen Garden of Beijing Botanical Garden and the rockery of Olympic Forest Park.

Publications

Honours and awards
 1999 Member of the Chinese Academy of Engineering (CAE)

References

1932 births
2022 deaths
People from Wuhan
Engineers from Hubei
China Agricultural University alumni
Academic staff of Beijing Forestry University
Chinese architects
Members of the Chinese Academy of Engineering